Nyang Station, often referred to as Nyang and previously known as Wogoola Station, is a pastoral lease that operates as a sheep station.

The property was established as Wogoola Station in 1891 by a partnership between James Clark and Alexander Cameron. Cameron had previously owned Towera Station, which he had sold the same year. The name Wogoola is the Indigenous Australian name for a waterhole located a few hundred metres away from the homestead.

In 1951 the station was put up for auction again. The  property, carrying a flock of 6,300 sheep, attracted a highest bid of £10,000.

See also
 List of ranches and stations

References

Pilbara
Pastoral leases in Western Australia
Stations (Australian agriculture)
Heritage places of Western Australia
1891 establishments in Australia